Paavo is an Estonian and Finnish masculine given name, cognate to "Paul". The Finnish patronymic surname Paavolainen is derived from it.

It may refer to:

Paavo Aaltonen (1919–1962), Finnish gymnast and a three-time Olympic champion
Paavo Aarniokoski (1893–1961), Finnish politician
Paavo Aho (1891–1918), Finnish track and field athlete who competed in the 1912 Summer Olympics
Paavo Arhinmäki (born 1976), Finnish politician, the incumbent Minister for Culture and Sport and a member of the Finnish Parliament
Paavo Berg (1911–1941), Finnish fighter ace
Paavo Berglund (1929–2012), Finnish conductor
Paavo Cajander (1846–1913), Finnish poet and translator
Paavo Haavikko (1931–2008), Finnish poet and playwright
Paavo Heininen (1938–2022), Finnish composer and pianist
Paavo Hukkinen (1911–1988), German-Finnish actor
Paavo Hynninen (1883–1960), former Finnish diplomat, Minister of Foreign Affairs
Paavo Järvi (born 1962), Estonian-American conductor, and current music director of the Orchestre de Paris
Paavo Johansson (1895–1983), Finnish athlete who competed mainly in the javelin throw
Paavo Korhonen (born 1928), Finnish Nordic skier who competed in the 1950s
Paavo Kotila (1927–2014), former Finnish long-distance runner, Olympian, and thrice national champion in the marathon
Paavo Lötjönen (born 1968), cello player for Finnish band Apocalyptica
Paavo Liettu (1905–1964), Finnish track and field athlete who competed in the 1928 Summer Olympics
Paavo Lipponen (born 1941), Finnish politician and former reporter
Paavo Lonkila (1923–2017), Finnish farmer and cross-country skier who competed in the 1940s and 1950s
Paavo Lukkariniemi (born 1941), Finnish ski jumper who competed in the mid-1960s
Paavo Matsin (born 1970), Estonian writer and literary critic
Paavo Miettinen (1919–1985), Finnish Olympic fencer
Paavo Nikula (born 1942), former Chancellor of Justice of Finland and a former Member of the Parliament of Finland
Paavo Nõgene (born 1980), Estonian government official
Paavo Nurmi (1897–1973), Finnish runner
Paavo Piironen (1943–1974), Finnish film actor, director and writer of the 1960s and early 1970s
Paavo Puurunen (born 1973), Finnish biathlete
Paavo Pylkkänen (born 1959), Finnish philosopher of mind
Paavo Rantanen (born 1934), former Finnish Foreign Ministry official, briefly the Minister for Foreign Affairs
Paavo Ruotsalainen (1777–1852), Finnish farmer and lay preacher
Paavo Siljamäki, (born 1977), Finnish trance artist, one-third of the UK based trance group Above & Beyond
Paavo Susitaival (1896–1993), Finnish author, soldier and politician
Paavo Talvela (1897–1973), Finnish soldier and a Knight of the Mannerheim Cross
Paavo Vallius (born 1949), Swedish politician
Paavo Vaskio (1931–2012), Finnish sprint canoeist who competed in the early 1960s
Paavo Väyrynen (born 1946), Finnish veteran politician of the Centre Party
Paavo Vierto (1915–1941), Finnish ski jumper who competed in the early 1940s
Paavo Virkkunen (1874–1959), Finnish conservative politician
Paavo Yrjölä (1902–1980), Finnish track and field athlete, won the gold medal in the decathlon at the 1928 Olympics

See also
Paavo, a Life in Five Courses, a 2010 Finnish-American documentary film

Masculine given names
Estonian masculine given names
Finnish masculine given names